Teddington Lifeboat Station is a lifeboat station in Teddington, in west London, on the River Thames. It is one of the Royal National Lifeboat Institution (RNLI)'s newest lifeboat stations and is also one of the first to cover a river rather than estuarial waters or the sea. Teddington Lock is the highest tidal point on the Thames.

Establishment
Following the collision in 1989 between the Marchioness and the dredger Bowbelle that resulted in the loss of 51 lives, the "Thames Safety Inquiry" recommended a centrally coordinated search and rescue presence on the Thames. The Maritime and Coastguard Agency (MCA) was chosen to coordinate the services that already existed on the Thames. Since they already had operational duties, they approached the RNLI and asked if they could provide a rescue service.

The RNLI recommended the creation of four lifeboat stations on the Thames to cover the tidal area between Teddington and the Channel, with locations approved at Teddington, Chiswick, Tower and Gravesend.

On 1 January 2002 Teddington lifeboat station became fully operational. It was thought that the lifeboat stations on the Thames would have to deal with approximately 50 call-outs per year. However, in the first year of operation, there were over 800 call-outs. In fact, the Thames lifeboat stations accounted for 10% of the total number of call-outs, or "shouts", that the RNLI responded to.

Although Teddington is not the busiest Thames station it was quickly realised that its presence should extend further upstream to Molesey Lock, thereby including Kingston upon Thames within its operational area. In order to deal with this additional area, and to ensure operational effectiveness above and below Teddington Lock, Teddington is equipped with three "D Class" lifeboats and, unlike the other Thames stations, is run on a purely voluntary basis.

Boats currently in use

D-576: Spirit of the Thames

This boat entered service at Teddington in June 2002. The boat was purchased from funds raised by Twickenham and Teddington fundraising branch. This boat was the last of the "old-style" D class lifeboats to be built, before the introduction of the IB-1. She was officially named in June 2003.

D-743: Olwen and Tom

Olwen and Tom entered service at Teddington in December 2010. She was a gift by Peter and Hilary Saw, in memory of the latter's parents, Gwladys Olwen Martin and Thomas Frederick Shelton. She was formally named on 21 May 2011 and is now the number two boat at the station, since the arrival of Peter Saw.

D-785: Peter Saw 
Peter Saw entered service at Teddington in October 2015. She was a gift by Hilary Saw, in memory of her husband Peter Henry Saw. Since joining the station, she has been the main station boat and was formally named on 7 May 2016.

Boats previously in use

D-477: Spirit of Nuneaton and Bedworth

Spirit of Nuneaton and Bedworth was Teddington RNLI's first ever lifeboat and was the first operational boat for the station. She entered service at Teddington at the station's inception, having been used as a training craft whilst the station was being set up during 2001. Once the station became operational, she was the station's only boat until the arrival of Spirit of the Thames. She left Teddington after the arrival of Spirit of Mortimer and returned to the reserve fleet.

D-648: Spirit of Mortimer

Spirit of Mortimer entered service at Teddington in May 2005, having made an appearance on the floor of the Barbican Arts Centre during the RNLI AGM. She was purchased from funds raised the Mortimer fund raising branch and was Teddington's first IB-1. She left Teddington on the arrival of the Peter Saw.

Crew

There are approximately 24 voluntary crew members, including engineers, bankers and designers, few members having any professional seafaring experience. They train every week in order to achieve the high standards of competence and safety expected of the RNLI.

In the event of a call-out, every crew member's pager is simultaneously activated by the London Coastguard. Twenty-four hours a day, 365 days of the year, the crew aim to launch one or both boats, depending on the nature of the incident, within six minutes of the call to the Coastguard. Their operational target is to be on scene within 15 minutes of the original call. This can be tight if the incident is in Molesey.

See also
 Royal National Lifeboat Institution

References

External links

 The crew website of Teddington lifeboat
 The official page of the Teddington lifeboat at the RNLI website

2002 establishments in England
Lifeboat stations in London
River Thames
Teddington
Transport in the London Borough of Richmond upon Thames